<onlyinclude>

Canada's Walk of Fame, located in Toronto, Ontario, is a walk of fame that acknowledges the achievements and accomplishments of successful Canadians. It consists of a series of stars imbedded in 13 designated blocks worth of sidewalks in Toronto, located in front of Roy Thomson Hall, the Princess of Wales Theatre, and the Royal Alexandra Theatre on King and Simcoe streets. The first group of members was inducted in 1998, and it has since expanded to include the RBC Emerging Artist Music Mentorship Prize competition, which assists emerging Canadian musicians with getting their careers off the ground.

The Walk of Fame was first conceived in 1996 when Peter Soumalias suggested the idea of a Walk of Fame for famous Torontonians to the board of the Toronto Entertainment District Association. They rejected his idea but he went on to establish a Walk of Fame for Canadians. Canada's Walk of Fame runs an annual contest in which Canadians can nominate potential inductees. In 2000, prior to the introduction of the online voting system, over 30,000 nominations were received via letters, fax and e-mail. The committee then analyzes the nominees based on the following criteria: the nominee was born in Canada or has spent their formative or creative years in Canada, they have had a minimum of 10 years experience in their field and they have had a national or international impact on Canada’s Cultural heritage. Following the Selection Committee's evaluation, the nominees that meet all of the requirements are forwarded to the board of directors, who then select the inductees.

New inductees are inducted annually at an unveiling ceremony where their star, a stylized maple leaf, is revealed. The first was held in 1998 and only four of the twelve then-living inductees attended: Karen Kain, Norman Jewison, Barbara Ann Scott and Rich Little. Since 2008, the Walk of Fame also hands out the Cineplex Legends Award, which is posthumously awarded "to Canadian pioneers in film, music, sport, arts, and innovation." In 2010 the Allan Slaight Award was introduced, which recognizes the achievements of young Canadians who have the ability to turn their talent into inspiration. The award is presented annually to a young Canadian who is making a positive impact in the field of music, film, literature, visual or performing arts, sports, innovation or philanthropy. The list of recipients of the Allan Slaight Award include: Nikki Yanofsky in 2010, Drake in 2011, Melanie Fiona in 2012, Carly Rae Jepsen in 2013, The Weeknd in 2014, Shawn Mendes in 2015, Brett Kissel in 2016, Shawn Hook in 2017, Jessie Reyez in 2018 and Alessia Cara in 2019.

Of the 168 stars on the walk of fame, 154 are for individuals, including athletes; coaches; actors, directors, writers and producers of movies, television and stage; singers, songwriters and musicians; playwrights; authors; comedians; cartoonists; and supermodels. Fourteen stars have been given to groups, such as music bands, comedy troupes and sports teams. In these cases, the group name is listed on the star and the names of individual members are omitted.

Inductees
Some inductees were unable to attend the ceremony the year they were inducted, and as a result were honoured in a ceremony in a later year.

See also

 Canada: A People's History
 Canadian Newsmaker of the Year
 Heritage Minutes
 List of stars on the Hollywood Walk of Fame
 Persons of National Historic Significance
 The Greatest Canadian

References

General
 
 

Specific

External links

 

Lists of Canadian people
Lists of celebrities
Lists of hall of fame inductees
Inductees of Canada's Walk of Fame